Bury Me Not on the Lone Prairie is a 1941 American Western film directed by Ray Taylor and written by Sherman L. Lowe and Victor McLeod. The film stars Johnny Mack Brown, Fuzzy Knight, Nell O'Day, Kathryn Adams Doty, Harry Cording and Ernie Adams. The film was released on March 21, 1941, by Universal Pictures.

Plot

Cast        
Johnny Mack Brown as Joe Henderson
Fuzzy Knight as Lem Fielding
Nell O'Day as Edna Fielding
Kathryn Adams Doty as Dorothy Walker
Harry Cording as J. L. Red Clinton
Ernie Adams as Mustang
Ed Cassidy as Sheriff
Don House as Bob Henderson
Pat J. O'Brien as Bill Salters
Lee Shumway as Andy Walker
Jim Corey as Barney 
Frank O'Connor as Dan Wendall
William Desmond as Bartender
Bud Osborne as Calvert 
Jimmy Wakely as Jimmy Wakely

References

External links
 

1941 films
1940s English-language films
American Western (genre) films
1941 Western (genre) films
Universal Pictures films
Films directed by Ray Taylor
American black-and-white films
1940s American films